The Detroit Zoo is a zoo located in the cities of Huntington Woods and Royal Oak in the U.S. state of Michigan.  Spanning , it houses more than 2,000 animals and more than 245 different species. It was the first U.S. zoo to feature bar-less habitats,  and is regarded to be an international leader in animal welfare, conservation and sustainability by the Detroit Zoological Society.

History

The original Detroit Zoo opened in 1883 on Michigan and Trumbull Avenues, across from Tiger Stadium. William Cameron Coup's circus had arrived in town, but it succumbed due to financial difficulties. Luther Beecher, a local businessman, financed the purchase of the circus animals and erected a building for their display called the Detroit Zoological Garden.  The Zoo closed the following year and the building was converted into a horse auction site (the Michigan Avenue Horse Exchange).

The Detroit Zoological Society was founded in 1911, but the Zoo's official opening did not occur until August 1, 1928. During the opening ceremony, acting Mayor John C. Nagel was to speak. He arrived late, and parked his car behind the bear dens, where a polar bear leaped from its moat toward him. Nagel stuck out his hand and walked toward the polar bear joking, "He's the reception committee."  The keepers rushed the bear and forced him back into the moat, leaving the mayor uninjured.

By 1930, the zoo included, Bear Dens and Sheep Rocks, Bird House, the Elk Exhibit, the Baboon Rock, and Primate and Reptile houses.

The Great Depression brought a halt to additional expansion until the 1940s, and expansion has continued since then. During the Depression, one of the more popular attractions was Jo Mendi, a four-year-old chimpanzee purchased by the zoo director with his own funds. A veteran of Broadway and motion pictures, the chimp performed for the audience. One press account stated, "he enjoys every minute of the act...He counts his fingers, dresses, laces his shoes, straps up his overalls; pours tea and drinks it; eats with a spoon, dances and waves farewell to his admirers."  When the chimpanzee fell ill in late 1932 after eating a penny, surgeons from area hospitals came to check him out. During his recovery, visitors brought toys, peanuts and more than $500 worth of flowers, along with several thousand cards and letters. Jo died in 1934 from hoof and mouth disease.

In 1939, funded by a donation from Mary Rackham, sculptor Corrado Parducci created the Horace Rackham Memorial Fountain, known as "the Bear Fountain." During the summer, the fountain is a splash pad and in winter it becomes an ice rink.

From the 1950s through the early 1970s, local weatherman Sonny Eliot hosted a program, At the Zoo, shown on Saturdays on television station WDIV.

In 1950, the zoo hired senior floriculturist Thomas (Fred) Roberts. Roberts was a recognized expert on dahlias and his gardens at the zoo, particularly the dahlia exhibit to the west of the Rackham Memorial Fountain, attracted visitors from across the country. Throughout the mid century era and into the 1980s, the zoo's gardens were elaborate displays of perennial plants, flowers, and tropical varieties. Sonny Eliot interviewed Roberts for one of his episodes of At the Zoo. Fred Roberts remained at the zoo until 1978. His garden designs were maintained through the 1980s. 

Until 1982, trained chimpanzees performed for visitors, but the act was discontinued at the insistence of animal rights activists. In 1982, the zoo began to charge an admission fee.

The Arctic Ring of Life, one of North America's largest polar bear habitats, opened in 2001. Centered around a 300,000 gallon aquarium, it allows visitors to view polar bears from a 70-foot underwater tunnel made of clear acrylic.  Other new buildings include the Ruth Roby Glancy Animal Health Complex (2004) and the  Ford Education Center (2005), which offers school and youth group programs as well as having a theater and exhibit space.

In 2005 the Zoo became the first in the U.S. to no longer keep elephants for ethical reasons, claiming the Michigan winters were too harsh for the animals and that confining them was stressful. The elephants, Wanda and Winky, were relocated to the Performing Animal Welfare Society's (PAWS) sanctuary in San Andreas, California.  Winky died in April 2008 ;  Wanda died in February 2015. The former elephant exhibit was renovated and is now home to two white rhinoceros, Jasiri and Tamba.

The Australian Outback Adventure, opened in 2006, allows visitors to walk through a simulated Outback containing red kangaroos and red-necked wallabies. Nothing separates visitors from the marsupials, allowing the animals to hop freely onto the walking path.

On February 18, 2006, the Detroit City Council voted to shut down the Zoo as part of budget cuts, being unable to reach an agreement with the Society to take over the park and a legislative grant having expired that day.  An uproar ensued and the Council, on March 1, 2006, voted to transfer operations to the Society with a promised $4 million grant from the Michigan Legislature. The city retained ownership of the assets, including the Zoo in Royal Oak and the Belle Isle Nature Center in Detroit.  The Society is responsible for governance, management and operations, including creating a plan to raise funds for long-term operations..  On August 5, 2008, voters in Macomb, Oakland, and Wayne counties overwhelmingly passed a zoo tax that provides sustainable funding to supplement earned revenue and philanthropic support.

The Penguinarium was temporarily renamed the "Winguinarium" in 2009 while the Detroit Red Wings played the Pittsburgh Penguins in the 2009 NHL Stanley Cup Final.

In 2011, the lions' enclosure was remodeled, providing animals more than double the room, new landscaping, and a glass wall to allow closer encounters with visitors. The Zoo also has the Simulator Ride, a 4-D Theater, the Tauber Family Railroad and a carousel.

In 2013, the Zoo celebrated its single largest donation ever ($10 million) by announcing plans for the Polk Penguin Conservation Center (PPCC), which opened in 2016. The Center replaces the Penguinarium (which itself was revolutionary when built in 1968) and became the world's largest facility dedicated to the study of penguins. The Penguinarium will be converted into event space.

In 2017, a biodigester was installed to convert manure and food waste into methane, which is then used to power the zoo's animal hospital.

In September 2019, the Penguin Center was closed for waterproofing repairs. The penguins were moved back to the original Penguinarium (their home from 1968 to 2015) until the Polk Center reopened. The center reopened on February 14, 2022 after delays due to the COVID-19 pandemic. It contains 5 species of penguins; King, Macaroni, Gentoo, Chinstrap and Rockhopper.

On July 6, 2019, the Zoo celebrated the birth of Keti, a red panda cub, born after a 4-month gestation period.

Habitats

National Amphibian Conservation Center
The National Amphibian Conservation Center is a $7 million, 12,000-square-foot facility situated on a two-acre Michigan wetland area and pond called "Amphibiville".  The Center, which opened in June 2000, has a diverse range of frogs, toads, salamanders, newts and caecilians.  The Wall Street Journal dubbed the attraction "Disneyland for toads". The Center participates in research and conservation efforts for species including the Panamanian golden frog, Puerto Rican crested toad, and Wyoming toad.

In 2002, the Zoo was awarded the AZA National Exhibit Award for Amphibiville.

The Arctic Ring of Life

The 4-acre Arctic Ring of Life, opened in October 2001, is home to three polar bears and two southern sea otters. It is among the largest polar bear habitats in North American zoos.

In 2003, the Zoo was awarded the AZA Significant Achievement Award for the Arctic Ring of Life.

Cotton Family Wetlands and Boardwalk
Mimicking a Michigan ecosystem, the 1.7-acre pond and wetlands area and accompanying 7,200-square-foot boardwalk is home to native fish, frogs, turtles and birds as well as trumpeter swans. The boardwalk is made from 95-percent recycled material composed primarily of plastic grocery bags and reclaimed hardwood. The Wetlands and Boardwalk are bounded by Amphibiville, the Warchol Beaver Habitat, the Edward Mardigian Sr. River Otter Habitat, and the Holden Reptile Conservation Center.

Due to a $102,350 grant from NOAA, the Wetlands are also used as professional development and outdoor classroom for teachers and students underrepresented in science fields.

Cotton Family Wolf Wilderness

The Cotton Family Wolf Wilderness is a $1.4 million two-acre sanctuary that features native meadows and trees, a flowing stream and pond, dens, and elevated rock outcroppings, for two gray wolves. The habitat also incorporates a renovated historic log cabin which had existed on the property.

Giraffe Encounter

The guests feed reticulated giraffes from an 18-foot-tall platform that extends into their habitat in the Giraffe Encounter. This experience, which started in July 2007, runs Tuesday through Sunday from spring through fall. This is an added fee.

The Great Apes of Harambee

The Great Apes of Harambee is a 4-acre indoor/outdoor habitat home to chimpanzees and western lowland gorillas.  The animals may be rotated into each other's habitat spaces,  simulating nomadic movement similar to wild behavior.

Holden Reptile Conservation Center
Opened as the Holden Museum of Living Reptiles in 1960, the Holden Reptile Conservation Center is home to 150 reptiles representing 70 species, 45 percent of which are considered threatened or endangered in the wild.

Edward Mardigian Sr. River Otter Habitat

The Edward Mardigian Sr. River Otter Habitat provides a habitat for North American river otters and features a 9,000-gallon pool with a waterfall and waterslide. The pool is enclosed on one side by a glass wall, on the other side of which is an observation building. The habitat affords visitors – including small children – an eye-level view of the otters as they swim.

Polk Penguin Conservation Center

The Polk Penguin Conservation Center (PPCC), opened in April 2016,  is the largest center for penguins in the world and was awarded the 2017 Exhibit Award by the Association of Zoos and Aquariums for excellence in exhibit design.

The PPCC was closed for waterproofing repairs until winter/spring 2022.

Jane and Frank Warchol Beaver Habitat
Opened in 2013, the Jane and Frank Warchol Beaver Habitat abuts the Cotton Family Wetlands, and is home to nine North American beavers. As beavers are nocturnal, their night-time activities are recorded and played throughout the day on televisions in the exhibit. This is the first time beavers have been on display at the Zoo since 1969.

The Wildlife Interpretive Gallery
The Wildlife Interpretive Gallery is home to the Butterfly Garden, Matilda Wilson Free-Flight Aviary, Science On a Sphere, as well as the Society's permanent fine art collection. The Shelle Isle exhibit is dedicated to the partula snail.

Detroit Zoological Society

The Detroit Zoological Society is a non-profit organization that operates the Zoo and the Belle Isle Nature Center. Its $44.5 million annual operating budget is supported by earned revenue, philanthropic support, and tri-county (Macomb, Oakland, and Wayne) millage. The organization has 260 full and part-time employees, more than 52,000 member households, and more than 1,000 volunteers.

Its mission is "Celebrating and Saving Wildlife", the Society claims to be a leader in animal conservation and welfare. In collaboration with the DNR and USFWS, the Society continues to release Zoo-reared federally endangered Karner blue butterflies in their natural habitats in Michigan. Each summer, Society bird keepers assist with conservation efforts in northern Michigan for the federally endangered Great Lakes piping plover by artificially incubating abandoned piping plover eggs. Most recently, the Society, in collaboration with the Detroit River International Wildlife Refuge and the Detroit Water and Sewerage Department, established of a common tern nesting site on Belle Isle.

The  Society assists with the rescue of exotic animals from private owners, pseudo-sanctuaries, roadside zoos, and circuses. Among its rescues are more than 1,000 exotic animals confiscated from an animal wholesaler in Texas, a polar bear confiscated from a circus in Puerto Rico, a lioness used to guard a crack house, and retired racehorses. In addition, the Society and the Michigan Humane Society, in collaboration with dozens of local animal welfare organizations, host Meet Your Best Friend at the Zoo, the nation's largest offsite companion animal adoption program. Since the event's inception in 1993, more than 25,000 dogs, cats, and rabbits have been placed into new homes at the spring and fall events.

The Center for Zoo and Aquarium Animal Welfare and Ethics (CZAAWE) was created in 2009 as a resource center for captive exotic animal welfare knowledge and best practices. It provides a much-needed forum for exotic animal welfare policy discussion/debate and recognizes captive exotic animal welfare initiatives through awards.

The Society provides educational experiences to nearly 70,000 teachers and students annually through camps, curriculum-based field trips, family and youth programs and professional development opportunities. The Society also supports students and teachers through conservation education in rural rainforest communities through the Adopt-A-School program. The Berman Academy for Humane Education offers a broad range of programs that help people help animals. The academy uses a variety of teaching strategies – from traditional instruction to storytelling, role-playing, theater, and virtual technology – to educate audiences about the need to treat other living creatures with empathy, respect and gentleness.

Accredited by the Association of Zoos & Aquariums, the Zoo features many award-winning habitats including the Wildlife Interpretive Gallery, National Amphibian Conservation Center, Great Apes of Harambee and Arctic Ring of Life, which was named the number-two best zoo exhibit in the U.S. by the Intrepid Traveler's guide to "America's Best Zoos".

The Simulator Ride offers an educational experience from a motion-simulated theater seat.  The 126-seat 4-D Theater, the only of its kind at any Michigan zoo, features special effects such as blasts of wind, mist and scents.

Belle Isle Nature Center
The Belle Isle Nature Center sits on a five-acre site surrounded by undisturbed forested wetlands on Belle Isle State Park in Detroit. The facility features indoor animal habitats, a bee exhibit, bird observation window, an outdoor native butterfly garden, outdoor classrooms, nature play area and the Blue Heron Lagoon Nature Trail. It provides year-round educational, recreational and environmental conservation opportunities for the community.

See also

Architecture of metropolitan Detroit
Tourism in metropolitan Detroit
Detroit Zoo Map HD

Notes

References and further reading
Austin, William (1974). The First Fifty Years. The Detroit Zoological Society.

Kvaran, Einar Einarsson. Shadowing Parducci, unpublished manuscript, Detroit.

External links

Timeline of Zoo history
Belle Isle Nature Center

Zoos in Michigan
Culture of Detroit
Metro Detroit
National Register of Historic Places in Oakland County, Michigan
Protected areas of Oakland County, Michigan
Tourist attractions in Metro Detroit
Buildings and structures in Oakland County, Michigan
Royal Oak, Michigan
Historic districts on the National Register of Historic Places in Michigan